The 2023 Chinese Football Association Division Two League season will be the 34th season since its establishment in 1989. This season, the league expanded to 20 teams from 18 that previous season.

Clubs

Club changes

To League Two
Teams relegated from 2022 China League One
Beijing BIT

Teams promoted from 2022 Chinese Champions League
Yuxi Yukun
Chongqing Tongliangloong
Guangxi Lanhang
Dalian Duxing
Fuzhou Hengxing

From League Two
Teams promoted to 2023 China League One
Jinan Xingzhou
Dandong Tengyue
Yanbian Longding

Teams relegated to 2023 Chinese Champions League
Inner Mongolia Caoshangfei

Dissolved entries
Xinjiang Tianshan Leopard

Name changes
Chongqing Tongliangloong F.C. changed their name to Chongqing Tonglianglong in March 2023.
Wuxi Wugou F.C. changed their name to Wuxi Wugo in March 2023.

Clubs information

Clubs locations

Managerial changes

Notes

References

External links
Soccerway

3
China League Two seasons